Cameron Faulkner (born 22 May 1984) is a former professional Australian rules footballer who played with the Western Bulldogs.

Faulkner was recruited to through the 2002 National AFL Draft at number 17 which had been traded by St Kilda for Luke Penny.

In season 2005 he played the first four games, but was dropped thereafter and did not return until round 12.  He broke his collarbone in round 15 against Fremantle which put him out for the rest of the season. He played in only three games in the 2006 season, with a shoulder injury in a Round 10 VFL match further hampering his attempts to earn selection.

The 2006 Record describes Faulkner as an exciting and quick small forward/midfielder (he is only 170 cm tall). Faulkner plays in number 18. He was delisted at the end of the 2007 AFL season after playing only one game for the year.

After returning to his SANFL club, Central District, for a year, he is now playing for the East Roxby Roos in  Roxby Downs SA.( as a coach/player )

References

External links

1984 births
Living people
Australian rules footballers from South Australia
Western Bulldogs players
Indigenous Australian players of Australian rules football
Central District Football Club players
Werribee Football Club players